Pimenta may refer to:

 Pimenta (surname), a Portuguese surname
 Pimenta (genus), a genus of plants that includes allspice
 Pimenta, Minas Gerais, a Brazilian municipality
 Pimenta Bueno, Rondônia, a Brazilian municipality
 Chocolate com Pimenta, a Brazilian telenovela 
 Pimenta's Point, an anatomical landmark

See also 
 Pimienta (disambiguation)
 Pimental, surname
 Pimentel (disambiguation)
 Pimento (disambiguation)